The Battle of the Spoiling Dyke (also known as the Battle of the Spoiled Dyke, was a Scottish clan battle that took place in 1578, fought in the Scottish Highlands, between the MacDonalds of Uist and the Clan MacLeod.

The MacDonalds of Uist barred the doors of Trumpan Church, or Kilconan Church as it was once known, east of the shores of Ardmore Bay. They then set fire to the church full of worshipers. No one escaped alive except one girl who, although mortally wounded, managed to give the alarm. On hearing the news, the chief of Clan MacLeod and his men set off for Ardmore bay where a battle ensued. The MacDonalds were killed almost to a man. The corpses of the MacDonalds were dragged and then buried in a turf dyke, and the incident remembered as the "Battle of the Spoiling Dyke". The atrocity by the MacDonalds was to exact vengeance on the MacLeods for their atrocity of the massacre of MacDonalds in the Cave of Frances on the Isle of Eigg a couple of years earlier. This again was a tit-for-tat revenge between the two feuding clans.

See also
Battle of the Braes
Glendale

References

1578 in Scotland
Spoiling Dyke
Clan Donald
Spoiling Dyke
Spoiling Dyke
Isle of Skye
Military action involving Scottish islands